Kluhyno-Bashkyrivka is a village in Chuhuiv Raion, Kharkiv Oblast (province) of eastern Ukraine.

The 92nd Mechanized Brigade is located in this village.

References

Villages in Chuhuiv Raion